OSIS or variant may refer to:

OSIS
 Open Source Information System
 Open Scripture Information Standard
 Organisasi Siswa Intra Sekolah, Indonesian for Intra-school students organization

-osis
The suffix -osis is used for forming a number of medical terms.  The suffix itself signifies only a general functional disorder, but the constructed words are more specific. It is often used to denote a biological process (i.e. Apoptosis, Phagocytosis, Necrosis...)

Osis
Osis (feminine: Ose), is a Latvian language surname meaning "ash" (tree; Fraxinus excelsior)
Guntis Osis (born 1962), Soviet Latvian bobsledder
Karlis Osis (1917–1997), paranormal researcher

See also
 OSI (disambiguation) for OSIs, the plural of OSI

Latvian-language masculine surnames